The Lagting, or Lagtinget, is the parliament of Åland, an autonomous, demilitarised and unilingually Swedish-speaking territory of Finland. The Lagting has 30 seats, which makes for approximately one seat per 700 voters in 2022.

Legislative work is carried out in three standing committees:
 Committee on Legal Affairs and Culture
 Committee on Economic and Monetary Affairs
 Committee on Social Affairs and the Local Environment

Electoral system
The 30 members of the Parliament of Åland are elected every four years by proportional representation, with seats allocated using the d'Hondt method. The age limit for voting rights is 18 years, in addition to which Åland's right to vote in the home region is a prerequisite for the stand for election.

Latest election

1979–2019 Election table

See also 
Government of Åland
List of speakers of the Parliament of Åland
Municipalities of Åland
Politics of Åland
Parliament of Finland
Government of Finland
Åland State Provincial Office
Swedish Assembly of Finland
Politics of Finland
Ting

References

External links 
Ålands Lagting -  Official site

Government of Åland
Politics of Åland
Aland
Aland
Aland
Aland
Åland law